Elkstones is a small hamlet in the parish of Warslow and Elkstones, consisting of Upper Elkstone and Lower Elkstone. Situated high in the Staffordshire Moorlands, Leek is the closest town.

Elkstones falls in the catchment area of Manifold Primary School, Churnet View Middle School and Leek High School.

See also
Listed buildings in Warslow and Elkstones

External links
 Parish Map

Towns and villages of the Peak District
Villages in Staffordshire
Staffordshire Moorlands